"Girl of My Dreams" is an English and Korean song by American rapper Juice Wrld and South Korean rapper Suga from South Korean pop group BTS. The track was released as a standalone digital release on December 10, 2021, serving as the first promotional single from Juice Wrld's fourth and second posthumous studio album, Fighting Demons (2021). It serves as the second collaboration between Juice Wrld and Suga from BTS, with the two having collaborated previously on the 2019 single "All Night"  from the soundtrack album BTS World: Original Soundtrack (2019).

Background and release
The first collaboration between Juice Wrld and Suga from BTS occurred in June 2019 on the single "All Night" from the soundtrack album BTS World: Original Soundtrack (2019). In July 2021, a snippet of track was previewed on Instagram by co-founder of Grade A productions Lil Bibby. The song being a collaboration with Suga of BTS was announced upon the track list release of its parent album on December 9, 2021. "Girl of My Dreams" was then released on Juice Wrld's 999 Club website shop as a standalone digital single on the album's release of December 10, 2021, serving as the album's first promotional single. This song is produced by Jaegen (known for producing “Unforgettable” by French Montana & Swae Lee), kookoo, Josh J, as well as Max Lord (Juice WRLD’s close friend & recording engineer)

Lyrics 
The song is written in both English and Korean. The song's lyrics depict Juice Wrld falling in love with someone and Suga of BTS singing about their eventual breakup due to the love between the couple being taken for granted. Juice Wrld in the song also references John Legend's 2013 hit single "All of Me" in the first verse and chorus of the track.

Charts

Year-end charts

Release history

See also 
 List of Billboard Digital Song Sales number ones of 2021

References

External links 
 

2021 singles
2021 songs
Juice Wrld songs
Songs written by Juice Wrld
Songs written by Suga (rapper)